Agustín Abadía Plana (born 15 April 1962) is a Spanish former professional football left midfielder and manager.

Blessed with few technical skills but a tremendous hard-worker, his professional career – which included 244 La Liga matches and 14 goals over nine seasons – was closely associated with CD Logroñés, as he served the club in several capacities and in two of its denominations.

In 1999, Abadía started working as a manager.

Playing career
Born in Binéfar, Province of Huesca, Aragon, Tato Abadía made his senior debut with local CD Binéfar. After two consecutive Tercera División championships, he helped the side promote to Segunda División B for the first time in its history, in 1983.

Two years later, Abadía signed for CD Logroñés in Segunda División, scoring three goals in 33 matches in his second season as the Riojans reached La Liga for the first time ever, and helped them retain their league status the following two years, being an important first-team member. In the summer of 1989 he joined Atlético Madrid, but returned to his previous club after only one season.

Abadía helped modest Logroñés consecutively remain in the top flight from 1990 to 1993, netting a career-best – both in the league and as a professional – five goals in the 1992–93 campaign, two of those coming on 14 March 1993 as the team came from behind 0–2 at the Santiago Bernabéu Stadium to draw 2–2 against Real Madrid. He moved to SD Compostela aged 31, and achieved another first-ever promotion in his career in his first year, with the Galician side reaching the top tier after finishing third and promoting in the playoffs against Rayo Vallecano, with the player taking part in all 270 minutes in the tie (two games and a third after the teams drew 1–1 on aggregate).

After appearing in only 14 league games in 1995–96 (only three starts), the 34-year-old Abadía returned again to Logroñés, but this time could not help prevent his main club's top-division relegation. He closed out his career with Binéfar in 1999, winning another division four championship in his first season.

Coaching career
Abadía started coaching with his last club, first at youth level, then successfully leading the team into safety in two consecutive third-tier seasons. He started 2002–03 with Logroñés' juniors, but was promoted to the main squad for the second division promotion playoffs, eventually falling short.
 
Abadía then managed Girona FC in division three, being dismissed after the seventh round of the 2004–05 campaign, which ended in relegation. Subsequently, he returned to Logroñés, and in the following years acted as both manager (youth and seniors) and director of football.

In late January 2011, after one year with CD Calahorra in the fourth division – fourth position, no playoff promotion– Abadía signed for another team in that tier, SD Logroñés (Club Deportivo had already folded after severe economical problems).

References

External links

1962 births
Living people
People from La Litera
Sportspeople from the Province of Huesca
Spanish footballers
Footballers from Aragon
Association football midfielders
La Liga players
Segunda División players
Segunda División B players
Tercera División players
CD Binéfar players
CD Logroñés footballers
Atlético Madrid footballers
SD Compostela footballers
Spanish football managers
Segunda División B managers
Tercera División managers
CD Binéfar managers
CD Logroñés managers
Girona FC managers